The Battle of Alcântara took place on 25 August 1580, near the brook of Alcântara, in the vicinity of Lisbon, Portugal, and was a victory of the Habsburg King Philip II over the other pretender to the Portuguese throne, Dom António, Prior of Crato.

Background
In Portugal, the death of King Sebastian of Portugal in 1578, with only an elderly childless great uncle to succeed him, plunged the country into a succession crisis. King Philip II of Spain was one of seven who laid claim to the Portuguese throne, and in June 1580 a Spanish army of about 40,000 men (about half of which were German and Italian mercenaries) invaded Portugal, under the command of Don Fernando Álvarez de Toledo, Duke of Alba.

Two years earlier, the Portuguese army had been decimated at the Battle of Ksar El Kebir (1578), causing the death and imprisonment of tens of thousands of Portuguese soldiers and nobles. Dom António also lacked support from what was left of the Portuguese nobility and high clergy, which chose to support Philip II instead. Dom António was therefore forced to recruit an irregular army composed mainly of local peasants and townspeople as well as 3,000 African slaves who fought for António in exchange for their freedom.

Battle

The Duke of Alba met little resistance and in July landed his forces at Cascais, west of Lisbon. By mid-August, the Duke was only 10 kilometers from the city. West of the small brook Alcântara, the Spanish encountered a Portuguese force on the eastern side of it, commanded by António, Prior of Crato (a grandson of King Manuel I of Portugal who had proclaimed himself King as António I) and his lieutenant Francisco de Portugal, 3rd Count of Vimioso.

The battle ended in a decisive victory for the Spanish army, both on land and sea. Two days later, the Duke of Alba captured Lisbon, and on March 25, 1581, Philip of Spain was crowned King of Portugal as Philip I.

Aftermath
The decimated Antonian army fled towards Porto with the intention of reassembling his troops, but was completely destroyed at Porto by the Spanish forces under the command of Don Sancho d'Avila. At the end of 1580, most of the Portuguese territory was in Spanish hands. Two more battles (1582 and 1583) over the succession were fought in the Azores.

Spain and Portugal would remain united in a personal union of the crowns (remaining formally independent and with autonomous administrations) for the next 60 years, until 1640. This period is called the Iberian Union.

See also
 War of the Portuguese Succession
 Capture of Porto
 Battle of Ponta Delgada
 Conquest of the Azores
 Timeline of Portuguese history

Notes

References
Geoffrey Parker, The Army of Flanders and the Spanish road, London, 1972 
 Henry Kamen, The Duke of Alba (New Haven–London: Yale University Press, 2004).
David Eggenberger: An encyclopedia of battles: accounts of over 1,560 battles from 1479 B.C. to the present (1985)
History of Portugal: pamphlet collection (197?)
Peter N. Stearns, William Leonard Langer: The Encyclopedia of world history: ancient, medieval, and modern, chronologically arranged (2001)
Cathal J. Nolan: The age of wars of religion, 1000-1650: an encyclopedia of global warfare and civilization (2006)
Newton de Macedo: História de Portugal: Glória e Declínio do Império-de D.Manuel I ao Domínio dos Filipes (2004) 
Jeremy Black: European warfare, 1494-1660 (2002)
Tony Jaques: Dictionary of Battles and Sieges: A-E (2007)
Thomas Henry Dyer: The history of modern Europe: from the fall of Constantinople, in 1453, to the war in the Crimea, Volume 2 (1857)
David S. Katz: The Jews in the history of England, 1485-1850 (1997)
Enciclopedia Universal Ilustrada. Espasa. Volume 6 (1999).
Dauril Alden: The making of an enterprise: the Society of Jesus in Portugal, its empire, and beyond, 1540-1750 (1996)

External links
 The Spanish Tercios 1525 - 1704

1580 in Portugal
Alcantara 1580
Alcantara 1580
Conflicts in 1580